Anastasia Sorokina (born 26 January 1980 in Minsk, Soviet Union) is a Belarusian chess player. She received the FIDE title of Woman International Master (WIM) in 2001 and is an International Arbiter (2002) and FIDE Trainer (2005).

Chess career 
Sorokina won the Belarus Girls' Chess Championship in her age group eight times (in 1992, 1993, 1994, 1995, 1996, 1997, 1998, and 2000). She came second in the Belarus Women's Chess Championship in 1998.

Sorokina represented Belarus in two Chess Olympiads in Yerevan 1996, and Elista 1998. She represented Australia in the 36th Chess Olympiad in Calvià 2004. Her best result was in 1998 when she scored 5.5/9 for Belarus on the reserve board.

She has been an arbiter for the Chess Olympiads in Bled 2002, Istanbul 2012, a number of FIDE Grand Prix 2012–13 events, as well as several other major FIDE tournaments.

In 2017 she headed the Belarusian Chess Federation. In this short time, much has been done to develop and popularize chess. Championships of Belarus have a new life. At the Youth Olympic Games, Belarus team shared the prestigious 3-4th place with the Chinese team. In the fall of 2018, Anastasia Sorokina was elected to the post of FIDE Vice President, and Belarus won the right to host the Chess Olympiad in Minsk in 2022.

Personal life 
Sorokina moved to Australia in 2003, and worked as a chess coach in the Queensland School of Chess, and then Chess Kids in Melbourne for a year. She then opened her own chess coaching business "Chess Academy" for several years. She currently lives in Belarus with her family. Her uncle was GM Viktor Kupreichik.

References

External links 
 
 

1980 births
Living people
Australian female chess players
Belarusian female chess players
Chess Woman International Masters
Chess Olympiad competitors
Belarusian emigrants to Australia
Chess players from Minsk
Chess arbiters